Matthew Maher is the name of:
Matthew Maher (soccer) (born 1984), American soccer player
Matthew Maher (actor), American television and theater actor
Matt Maher (born 1974), Canadian-born singer